Emmanuel Avornyo (born 3 May 2001) is a Ghanaian footballer who currently plays as a forward for Ghana Premier League side Bechem United.

Career 

Avornyo joined Bechem United on 7 August 2021 ahead of the 2021–22 season. He scored two goals on  the first match of the season against Medeama. It was also his first 2  goals ever  in the Ghana Premier League

References

External links 
 

Living people
2001 births
Association football forwards
Ghanaian footballers
Bechem United FC players
Ghana Premier League players